This is a list of towns in Canada. Only municipalities currently incorporated as towns are listed here.

Alberta  

Alberta has 107 towns.

British Columbia  

British Columbia has 14 towns.

Manitoba  

Manitoba has 25 towns.

New Brunswick  

New Brunswick has 27 towns.

Newfoundland and Labrador  

Newfoundland and Labrador have 277 towns.

Northwest Territories 
The Northwest Territories has four towns.

Nova Scotia  

Nova Scotia has 30 towns.

Ontario  

Ontario has 89 towns.

Prince Edward Island  

Prince Edward Island has seven towns.

Quebec  

Quebec does not officially differentiate between towns and cities as the general French term for both is "Ville". Quebec has 222 villas.

Saskatchewan  

Saskatchewan has 146 towns.

Yukon 
Yukon has three towns.

See also 

History of cities in Canada
Population of Canada by province and territory
List of census metropolitan areas and agglomerations in Canada
List of cities and towns of Upper Canada
List of cities in Canada
List of cities in North America
List of city nicknames in Canada
List of largest Canadian cities by census
List of the largest cities and towns in Canada by area
List of the largest municipalities in Canada by population
List of the largest population centers in Canada
List of villages in Canada
Origins of names of cities in Canada
Population of Canada by year
Regional municipality

References